The following are lists of hydroelectric power stations based on the four methods of hydroelectric generation:
 List of conventional hydroelectric power stations, hydroelectric generation through conventional dams
 List of pumped-storage hydroelectric power stations, hydroelectric generation through pumped-storage
 List of run-of-the-river hydroelectric power stations, hydroelectric generation through run-of-the-river hydropower
 List of tidal power stations, hydroelectric generation through tidal power

See also 
 List of hydroelectric power station failures